Eun-hee, also spelled Eun-hui or Un-hui, is a Korean feminine given name. The meaning differs based on the hanja used to write each syllable of the name. There are 26 hanja with the reading "eun" and 24 hanja with the reading "hee" on the South Korean government's official list of hanja which may be registered for use in given names.

People with this name include:

Athletes
Kim Eun-hui (volleyball) (born 1948), South Korean volleyball player
Park Eun-hui (born 1970), South Korean fencer
Cho Eun-hee (born 1972), South Korean handball player
Kim Eun-hui (diver) (born 1973), South Korean diver
Kim Eun-hui (judoka) (born 1973), South Korean judoka
Jeong Eun-hui (born 1977), South Korean handball player
Lee Eun-hee (judoka) (born 1979), South Korean judo practitioner
Son Un-hui (born 1981), North Korean gymnast
Chae Eun-hee (born 1982), South Korean marathon runner
Phi Un-hui (born 1985), North Korean football player
Ji Eun-hee (born 1986), South Korean professional golfer
Ryu Eun-hee (born 1990), South Korean handball player
Ryo Un-hui (born 1994), North Korean weightlifter

Entertainers
Choi Eun-hee (1926–2018), South Korean actress and wife of Shin Sang-ok who was kidnapped by Kim Jong-il
Bang Eun-hee (born 1967), South Korean actress
Hong Eun-hee (born 1980), South Korean actress 
Kim Eun-hee, South Korean playwright

Fictional characters
Lee Eun-hee, in 2012 South Korean television series Ji Woon-soo's Stroke of Luck
Kim Eun-hee, in 2013 South Korean television series TV Novel: Eunhui
Kwon Eun-hee, in 2013 South Korean television series Goddess of Marriage

See also
List of Korean given names

References

Korean feminine given names